Lake Boeckella is a small lake which lies 0.3 nautical miles (0.6 km) south of Hope Bay and drains by a small stream into Eagle Cove, at the northeast end of Antarctic Peninsula. It was discovered and named by the Swedish Antarctic Expedition, 1901–04, under Otto Nordenskjöld. Crustaceans from the genus Boeckella are found in this area.

The Crest is located just east of the lake.

Lakes of Antarctica
Bodies of water of Graham Land
Landforms of Trinity Peninsula